Boku Mo Wakaran (in Japanese: ボクも分からん, meaning "I don't understand either" in the Kansai-ben dialect) is Bogdan Raczynski's first album. It was released March 29, 1999, on Rephlex Records. Raczynski mailed a demo of this album to Rephlex Records' head Richard D. James, which resulted in him getting his first record deal.
On the CD, Track 24 contains two songs.

Track listing

References

External links
 Boku Mo Wakaran on Archive.org

1999 albums
Bogdan Raczynski albums
Rephlex Records albums